New Voices or New Voice may refer to:

Awards and programs for emerging talent
 New Voices (Celtic Connections musical commission), a series of new musical works commissioned by the Celtic Connections festival, Scotland
 New Voices Award, a picture book award for American writers of colour, established by Lee & Low Books
 New Voices Fellowship, sponsored by the Aspen Institute
 Old Vic New Voices, a British emerging talent programme for theatre
 Brave New Voices, an American youth poetry award
 New Voices, a program at the Bangkok International Film Festival

Other uses
 New Voices (magazine), an American magazine written for and by Jewish college students
 New Voices (TV series), a British television drama series directed by Paul Marcus
 New Voice Entertainment, an American music production company
 New Voices: An Album of First Recordings, a 1965 album by various artists including The Watersons

See also
 NewVoiceMedia, a British cloud service company